In mathematics, a Dirichlet series is any series of the form

It is a special case of general Dirichlet series.

Dirichlet series play a variety of important roles in analytic number theory. The most usually seen definition of the Riemann zeta function is a Dirichlet series, as are the Dirichlet L-functions. It is conjectured that the Selberg class of series obeys the generalized Riemann hypothesis. The series is named in honor of Peter Gustav Lejeune Dirichlet.

Combinatorial importance
Dirichlet series can be used as generating series for counting weighted sets of objects with respect to a weight which is combined multiplicatively when taking Cartesian products.

Suppose that A is a set with a function w: A → N assigning a weight to each of the elements of A, and suppose additionally that the fibre over any natural number under that weight is a finite set. (We call such an arrangement (A,w) a weighted set.) Suppose additionally that an is the number of elements of A with weight n. Then we define the formal Dirichlet generating series for A with respect to w as follows:

Note that if A and B are disjoint subsets of some weighted set (U, w), then the Dirichlet series for their (disjoint) union is equal to the sum of their Dirichlet series:

Moreover, if (A, u) and (B, v) are two weighted sets, and we define a weight function  by

for all a in A and b in B, then we have the following decomposition for the Dirichlet series of the Cartesian product:

This follows ultimately from the simple fact that

Examples
The most famous example of a Dirichlet series is

Provided that  is real-valued at all natural numbers , the respective real and imaginary parts of the Dirichlet series  have known formulas where we write : 

Treating these as formal Dirichlet series for the time being in order to be able to ignore matters of convergence, note that we have:

as each natural number has a unique multiplicative decomposition into powers of primes. It is this bit of combinatorics which inspires the Euler product formula.

Another is:

where  is the Möbius function. This and many of the following series may be obtained by applying Möbius inversion and Dirichlet convolution to known series. For example, given a Dirichlet character  one has

where  is a Dirichlet L-function.

If the arithmetic function  has a Dirichlet inverse function , i.e., if there exists an inverse function such that the Dirichlet convolution of f with its inverse yields the multiplicative identity 
, then the DGF of the inverse function is given by the reciprocal of F: 

Other identities include

where  is the totient function,

where Jk is the Jordan function, and

where σa(n) is the divisor function. By specialization to the divisor function d = σ0 we have

The logarithm of the zeta function is given by

Similarly, we have that

Here, Λ(n) is the von Mangoldt function. The logarithmic derivative is then

These last three are special cases of a more general relationship for derivatives of Dirichlet series, given below.

Given the Liouville function λ(n), one has

Yet another example involves Ramanujan's sum:

Another pair of examples involves the Möbius function and the prime omega function:

We have that the Dirichlet series for the prime zeta function, which is the analog to the Riemann zeta function summed only over indices n which are prime, is given by a sum over the Moebius function and the logarithms of the zeta function: 

A large tabular catalog listing of other examples of sums corresponding to known Dirichlet series representations is found here. 

For example, the DGF of the first of these functions is expressed as the product of the Riemann zeta function and the prime zeta function for any complex s with :

If f is a multiplicative function such that its DGF F converges absolutely for all , and if p is any prime number, we have that 

where  is the Moebius function. Another unique Dirichlet series identity generates the summatory function of some arithmetic f evaluated at GCD inputs given by 

We also have a formula between the DGFs of two arithmetic functions f and g related by Moebius inversion. In particular, if , then by Moebius inversion we have that . Hence, if F and G are the two respective DGFs of f and g, then we can relate these two DGFs by the formulas: 

There is a known formula for the exponential of a Dirichlet series.

 

where  is the Dirichlet inverse of f and where the arithmetic derivative of f is given by the formula  for all natural numbers .

Analytic properties
Given a sequence  of complex numbers we try to consider the value of

as a function of the complex variable s. In order for this to make sense, we need to consider the convergence properties of the above infinite series:

If  is a bounded sequence of complex numbers, then the corresponding Dirichlet series f converges absolutely on the open half-plane Re(s) > 1. In general, if an = O(nk), the series converges absolutely in the half plane Re(s) > k + 1.

If the set of sums 

is bounded for n and k ≥ 0, then the above infinite series converges on the open half-plane of s such that Re(s) > 0.

In both cases f is an analytic function on the corresponding open half plane.

The Dirichlet series case is more complicated, though: absolute convergence and uniform convergence may occur in distinct half-planes.

In many cases, the analytic function associated with a Dirichlet series has an analytic extension to a larger domain.

Abscissa of convergence 

Suppose 

 

converges for some  

Proposition 1. 

Proof. Note that:

and define 

 

where 

By summation by parts we have

Proposition 2. Define 
 
Then: 
 
is the abscissa of convergence of the Dirichlet series. 

Proof. From the definition 

 

so that

which converges as  whenever  Hence, for every  such that   diverges, we have  and this finishes the proof.

Proposition 3.

Proof. Note that 

 

and  we have by summation by parts, for 

Now find N such that for n > N, 

and hence, for every  there is a  such that for :

Formal Dirichlet series
A formal Dirichlet series over a ring R is associated to a function a from the positive integers to R

with addition and multiplication defined by

where

is the pointwise sum and

is the Dirichlet convolution of a and b.

The formal Dirichlet series form a ring Ω, indeed an R-algebra, with the zero function as additive zero element and the function δ defined by δ(1) = 1, δ(n) = 0 for n > 1 as multiplicative identity.  An element of this ring is invertible if a(1) is invertible in R.  If R is commutative, so is Ω; if R is an integral domain, so is Ω.  The non-zero multiplicative functions form a subgroup of the group of units of Ω.

The ring of formal Dirichlet series over C is isomorphic to a ring of formal power series in countably many variables.

Derivatives
Given

it is possible to show that

assuming the right hand side converges. For a completely multiplicative function ƒ(n), and assuming the series converges for Re(s) > σ0, then one has that

converges for Re(s) > σ0. Here, Λ(n) is the von Mangoldt function.

Products
Suppose

and

If both F(s) and G(s) are absolutely convergent for s > a and s > b then we have

If a = b and ƒ(n) = g(n) we have

Coefficient inversion (integral formula)

For all positive integers , the function f at x, can be recovered from the Dirichlet generating function (DGF) F of f (or the Dirichlet series over f) using the following integral formula whenever , the abscissa of absolute convergence of the DGF F 

It is also possible to invert the Mellin transform of the summatory function of f that defines the DGF F of f to obtain the coefficients of the Dirichlet series (see section below). In this case, we arrive at a complex contour integral formula related to Perron's theorem. Practically speaking, the rates of convergence of the above formula as a function of T are variable, and if the Dirichlet series F is sensitive to sign changes as a slowly converging series, it may require very large T to approximate the coefficients of F using this formula without taking the formal limit.

Integral and series transformations
The inverse Mellin transform of a Dirichlet series, divided by s, is given by Perron's formula. 

Another class of related derivative and series-based generating function transformations on the ordinary generating function of a sequence which effectively produces the left-hand-side expansion in the previous equation are respectively defined in.

Relation to power series
The sequence an generated by a Dirichlet series generating function corresponding to:

where ζ(s) is the Riemann zeta function, has the ordinary generating function:

Relation to the summatory function of an arithmetic function via Mellin transforms

If f is an arithmetic function with corresponding DGF F, and the summatory function of f is defined by 

 

Namely, we have that 

 

For  and any natural numbers , we also have the approximation to the DGF F of f given by

See also 
 General Dirichlet series
 Zeta function regularization
 Euler product
 Dirichlet convolution

References

 
 
 The general theory of Dirichlet's series  by G. H. Hardy. Cornell University Library Historical Math Monographs.   {Reprinted by} Cornell University Library Digital Collections
 
 
 
 

Zeta and L-functions
Mathematical series
Series expansions